Ceremony for the 21st Hong Kong Film Awards was held on 21 April 2002 in the Hong Kong Cultural Centre and hosted by Eric Tsang, Cecilia Yip, Jacqueline Pang and Cheung Tat-Ming. Twenty-three winners in eighteen categories were unveiled. The year's biggest winner was Shaolin Soccer, winning six awards in total. Its director and leading actor Stephen Chow clinched Best Director and a long-awaited Best Actor title after being nominated for the award seven times since 1991. The 21st Hong Kong Film Awards also saw the establishment of the Best Asian Film category, open to all non-Hong Kong films commercially released in Hong Kong within the previous calendar year. The first winner for this category is the Japanese animated feature Spirited Away.

Awards
Winners are listed first, highlighted in boldface, and indicated with a double dagger.

References

External links
 Official website of the Hong Kong Film Awards

2002
2001 film awards
2002 in Hong Kong
Hong